Deuce is the second album released by the band Beautiful Creatures. It was released in 2005 under the Spitfire label.

Track listing
All tracks by Beautiful Creatures

"Anyone" – 2:40
"Freedom" – 2:56
"Unforgiven" – 3:53 
"Save Me" – 3:28
"Superfly" – 2:47
"Empty" – 3:37
"Never" – 2:29
"Straight to Hell" – 2:48
"The Unknown" – 0:42
"Ton of Lead" – 5:30
"Brand New Day" – 3:10
"Thanks" – 3:32
"I Won't Be the One" – 0:17
"Starr Cross" (Japanese bonus track) – 5:32
"I Still Miss You" (Japanese bonus track) - 4:31

Personnel

Band
Joe Lesté – vocals
Alex Grossi - Lead Guitar
Anthony Focx - guitar, vocals (background), producer, engineer, mixing
Kenny Kweens - bass
Matt Starr - drums

Additional musicians
Michael Thomas - guitar
Glen Sobel – drums
Roxy Saint - additional vocals on "Never"

Additional Personnel
James Book - producer, engineer
Mark Chalecki - mastering
Kenny Kweens & Sean Reed - art direction, design

References

2005 albums
Beautiful Creatures (band) albums
Spitfire Records albums